National Basketball League may refer to:

 Indian National Basketball League
 Malaysia National Basketball League
 National Basketball League (1898–1904), U.S., first professional men's basketball league in the world
 National Basketball League (United States), 1937–49
 National Basketball League (Australia)
 National Basketball League (Bulgaria)
 National Basketball League (Canada), 1993–94
 National Basketball League of Canada
 National Basketball League (China), professional men's basketball minor league in China
 National Basketball League (Czech Republic)
 National Basketball League (England)
 National Basketball League (Indonesia)
 National Basketball League (Japan)
 National Basketball League (Kazakhstan)
 National Basketball League (Lithuania), semi-professional men's basketball league
 National Basketball League (New Zealand), semi-professional men's basketball league
 National Basketball League (Philippines), professional men's basketball league
 National Basketball League (Rwanda)
 National Basketball League (Singapore) 
 National Basketball League (Uganda)
 UAE National Basketball League, United Arab Emirates

See also 
 National Basketball League, a fictional sports league in the film BASEketball
 National Basketball Association
 NBL (disambiguation)